Methyl hydroperoxide is the organic compound with the formula CH3OOH.  It is a volaltile colorless liquid.  In addition to being of theoretical interest as the simplest organic hydroperoxide, methyl hydroperoxide is an intermediate in the oxidation of methane in the atmosphere.  When condensed or in concentrated form methyl hydroperoxide is rather explosive, unlike tertiary hydroperoxides such as tert-butylhydroperoxide.  Its laboratory preparation was first reported in 1929.

References

Hydroperoxides
Oxidizing agents
Organic compounds with 1 carbon atom